The 2021 FIS Ski Jumping Grand Prix was the 28th Summer Grand Prix season in ski jumping for men and the 10th for women.

Other competitive circuits this season included the World Cup, Continental Cup, FIS Cup, FIS Race and Alpen Cup.

Map of Grand Prix hosts  
All 7 locations hosting Grand Prix events for men (6), for women (5) and shared (4) in this season.

 Men
 Women
 Shared

Men 
Grand Prix history in real time

after LH event in Klingenthal (2 October 2021)

Calendar

Standings

Overall

Nations Cup

Prize money

Women 
Grand Prix history in real time

after LH event in Klingenthal (2 October 2021)

Calendar

Standings

Overall

Nations Cup

Prize money

Mixed team 
Grand Prix history in real time

after LH event in Chaykovsky (12 September 2021)

Points distribution 
The table shows the number of points won in the 2021 FIS Ski Jumping Grand Prix for men and women.

Notes

References 

Grand Prix
FIS Grand Prix Ski Jumping